Repatriation of Seamen Convention, 1926 is  an International Labour Organization Convention.

It was established in 1926.

Ratifications
As of 2023, the convention has been ratified by 47 states. Subsequently, 34 ratifying states have automatically denounced the treaty.

Revision
The principles found in the convention were revised in a later ILO treaty, the Repatriation of Seafarers Convention (Revised), 1987.

External links 
Text.
Ratifications.

International Labour Organization conventions
Treaties concluded in 1926
Treaties entered into force in 1928
Treaties of Argentina
Treaties of Azerbaijan
Treaties of Belgium
Treaties of Belize
Treaties of Bosnia and Herzegovina
Treaties of the Republic of China (1912–1949)
Treaties of Colombia
Treaties of Cuba
Treaties of Djibouti
Treaties of Egypt
Treaties of Estonia
Treaties of the French Third Republic
Treaties of the Weimar Republic
Treaties of Ghana
Treaties of Ba'athist Iraq
Treaties of the Irish Free State
Treaties of the Kingdom of Italy (1861–1946)
Treaties of Kyrgyzstan
Treaties of Montenegro
Treaties of Mauritania
Treaties of New Zealand
Treaties of Nicaragua
Treaties of Panama
Treaties of Peru
Treaties of Portugal
Treaties of Serbia and Montenegro
Treaties of Slovenia
Treaties of the Somali Republic
Treaties of North Macedonia
Treaties of Tajikistan
Treaties of Tunisia
Treaties of the Ukrainian Soviet Socialist Republic
Treaties of Uruguay
Treaties of the United Kingdom
Admiralty law treaties
Treaties extended to the French Southern and Antarctic Lands
Treaties extended to Italian Somaliland
Treaties extended to Curaçao and Dependencies
1926 in labor relations